Federico Villarreal Villarreal (* Lambayeque, 1850 - † Lima, 1923) was a Peruvian scientist, engineer and politician.

Biography

Early years 
Federico Villarreal was born August 31, 1850, in Túcume, Lambayeque. His parents were Ruperto Villarreal, and Manuela Villarreal.

Studies

He focused his studies there on mathematics, physics and engineering. He continued his studies in National University of San Marcos  and  former Escuela de Ingenieros, now National University of Engineering.

Death
Villarreal died in Lima on June 3, 1923.

References
 Anthony Watanabe, "Federico Villarreal, Matemático e Ingeniero", Lima 2008. (in Spanish)

1850 births
1923 deaths
Peruvian mathematicians
Peruvian politicians
Peruvian scientists
National University of San Marcos alumni